Persaura is a village in Bhinga City, under the Shrawasti district of the state of Uttar Pradesh, India. It is known for its celebrations of Muharram and Chup Tazia.

Geography

References

Villages in Shravasti district

ca:Bhinga
bpy:ভিঙ্গ
it:Bhinga
new:भिंगा
pt:Bhinga
sv:Bhinga
vi:Bhinga